Callum Watson (born 6 October 1989) is an Australian cross-country skier. He represented Australia at the 2014 Winter Olympics in Sochi, Russia. He also competed in the 2015 world championships in Falun, Sweden.

In 2014, Watson recorded a VO2 max of 89.6ml/kg/min at the Australian Institute of Sport (AIS). This broke the record for AIS athletes previously held by Cadel Evans.

His older sister Aimee Watson also represented Australia in cross-country skiing at the 2014 Winter Olympics.

Competition record

References

1989 births
Cross-country skiers at the 2014 Winter Olympics
Cross-country skiers at the 2018 Winter Olympics
Living people
Olympic cross-country skiers of Australia
Australian male cross-country skiers
Competitors at the 2015 Winter Universiade
21st-century Australian people